Anthony Plog (born November 13, 1947) is an American conductor, composer and trumpet player.

Life 
Plog was born in Glendale, California, United States. He is a fellow of the Music Academy of the West where he attended in 1968. From 2006 to 2007, he held the Roy Acuff Chair of Excellence at Austin Peay State University.

Works

Educational 
 Etudes & Duets Book I for trumpet
 Method for Trumpet – Volumes 1–7

Chamber music 
 2 Scenes for trumpet, soprano voice and organ (1974)
 3 Miniatures for horn and piano (1998)
 3 Miniatures for flute and piano (2007)
 3 Miniatures for trombone and piano (1994)
 3 Miniatures for trumpet and piano (1994)
 3 Miniatures for tuba and piano (1990)
 3 Profiles for antiphonal euphonium – tuba ensemble (2006)
 3 Sketches for oboe, horn in F and piano (1995)
 3 Sonnets for horn, piano and narrator
 4 Miniatures for viola and woodwind quintet (1983)
 4 Sketches for brass quintet (1990)
 4 Themes on Paintings of Edvard Munch for trumpet and organ (1986)
 4 Themes on Paintings of Goya for trombone and piano (2001)
 Animal Ditties II for trumpet, narrator and piano (1983)
 Animal Ditties III for horn, piano and narrator
 Animal Ditties IV (new version 2001) for brass tentet and narrator (1988/rev. 2001)
 Animal Ditties VI for woodwind quintet and narrator (1993)
 Animal Ditties VII for brass quintet and narrator (1987)
 Animal Ditties VIII for guitar and narrator (1986)
 Concertino for trumpet, trombone and piano (1999)
 Concertino for trumpet, trombone and brass ensemble (1999)
 Concerto for flute and piano (1986)
 Concerto No 1 for solo trumpet, large brass ensemble and percussion (1988)
 Concerto No 2 for trumpet and piano (1994)
 Contemplations for flugelhorn and piano (2007)
 Dialogue for horn, tuba and piano (1992)
 Dialogue for 2 tubas (2009)
 Double Concerto for Two Trumpets for 2 trumpets and piano reduction (2001)
 Fanfare M.T. for 9 trumpets (1995)
 Hurry Up for 4 trumpets (1993)
 Jocaan Trio for flute (+picc.), trumpet (+picc. Bb + flugelhorn) and organ (2010)
 Mini-Variations on Amazing Grace for brass ensemble (1990)
 Mosaics for brass quintet (1997)
 Nocturne for horn and piano (1987)
 Nocturne for trombone and piano
 Nocturne for trumpet and piano (1994)
 Nocturne for trumpet and organ (1994)
 Nocturne for tuba and piano (2004)
 Postcards for horn solo (1995)
 Postcards for trombone solo (1999–2002)
 Postcards for trumpet solo (1994)
 Scherzo for brass ensemble and percussion (1994)
 Short Meditation for 12 euphoniums or trombones (2010)
 Short Meditation for 12 violoncelli (2010)
 Sonata for trumpet and piano (2009)
 Statements for tuba (contrabass trombone) and piano (1994)
 Suite for 6 trumpets (1980)
 Summit Fanfare for brass ensemble (2004)
 Trio for brass for trumpet, horn and trombone (1996)
 Triple Concerto for trumpet, horn, trombone and piano (1995)
 Trombone Quartet No 1 “Densities” for trombone quartet (1998/2000)
 Tuba Concerto for tuba and piano reduction (1997)
 Tuba Sonata for tuba and piano (2007)

Solo and wind ensemble 
 3 Miniatures for trombone and wind ensemble (1994)
 3 Miniatures for trumpet and wind ensemble (1996)
 3 Miniatures for tuba and wind ensemble (1990)
 Concerto for flute and wind ensemble (1986)
 Concerto 2010 for brass quintet and wind ensemble (2010)
 Concerto No 1 for solo trumpet, wind ensemble and percussion (1988/2007)
 Contemplations for flugelhorn and wind ensemble (2007)
 Double Concerto for Two Trumpets for 2 solo trumpets and wind ensemble (2001)
 Triple Concerto for trumpet, horn, trombone and wind band (1995/2009)

Solo and orchestra 
 Concerto No 2 for trumpet and orchestra (1994)
 Double Concerto for Two Trumpets for 2 trumpets and chamber orchestra (2001)
 Nocturne for horn and string orchestra (1987)
 Nocturne for trombone and string orchestra (1996)
 Nocturne for trumpet and string orchestra (1994)
 Nocturne for tuba and string orchestra (2004)
 Triple Concerto for trumpet, horn, trombone and symphony orchestra (1995)
 Tuba Concerto for tuba and symphony orchestra (1997)

Orchestral 
 Animal Ditties V for orchestra and narrator (1992)
 Fuocoso for symphony orchestra (2008)
 Landscapes for symphony orchestra (1992)
 Scherzo for Symphony orchestra (2006)
 Symphony No 1 for antiphonal strings, 14 brass and percussion (1992/93)
 Weiter for symphony orchestra (2007)

Wind band / ensemble 
 Evolutions for wind band (1999)
 Mini-Variations on Amazing Grace for wind ensemble (1990)
 Textures for wind ensemble (2010)

References

External links

Living people
American male conductors (music)
American male composers
21st-century American composers
American trumpeters
American male trumpeters
1947 births
Musicians from Glendale, California
Academic staff of the Hochschule für Musik Freiburg
21st-century trumpeters
Classical musicians from California
21st-century American conductors (music)
21st-century American male musicians
Music Academy of the West alumni